Bearing Witness is an outdoor 1997 sculpture by Martin Puryear, installed outside the Ronald Reagan Building and International Trade Center in Washington, D.C., in the United States.

See also
 1997 in art
 List of public art in Washington, D.C., Ward 6

References

1997 establishments in Washington, D.C.
1997 sculptures
Outdoor sculptures in Washington, D.C.
Federal Triangle